Skopsko Eho (Macedonian  Cyrillic: Скопско ехо) translated: Skopje Echo is a weekly free local newspaper in North Macedonia and has 40 pages. Newspaper was published in 50.000 copies in November 2017. Newspaper has two attachments: "Podobro Zdravje" and "Avto Berza".

References

Mass media in Skopje
Macedonian-language mass media
Macedonian-language magazines